H. F. McKay (also documented as H. A. McKay) was an American politician. He and Lectured Crawford were elected to serve in the Georgia Legislature. He lived in Johnston Station, Georgia in Liberty County, Georgia. He was nominated to be the Republican candidate at their 1900 convention in Hinesville, Georgia.

See also
List of African-American officeholders (1900–1959)

References

Year of birth missing
20th-century American politicians
20th-century African-American politicians
Members of the Georgia House of Representatives
African-American state legislators in Georgia (U.S. state)
People from Liberty County, Georgia
African-American men in politics
Year of death missing